Children of Fire Mountain was a 13-part miniseries from New Zealand made in 1979. That year it received the Feltex Television Awards for "Best Drama", "Best Script", and Terence Cooper as "Best Actor" for his role as Sir Charles Pemberton.

In the UK it was shown on BBC1 three times between 3 March 1981 to 26 May 1981, 1 June 1984 to 24 August 1984 and 5 October 1985 to 28 December 1985.  It was also shown on Channel 4 between 9 April 1989 to 2 July 1989.

This series was also broadcast in Czechoslovakia where it was dubbed into both the Czech language and the Slovak language. In 2010, a DVD was released in the Czech Republic and also in Slovakia (with original Slovak dubbing for both countries).

Plot summary
Sir Charles Pemberton travelled to New Zealand from the United Kingdom on the advice of his doctor. Once there, he forms an idea to build a health spa on Maori land.  The story took place in New Zealand in 1900 and portrays the conflict between the world of the Maori and the white settlers.  A sub plot is the friendship between Tom (the son of the hotel owner where Sir Charles stays) and Sarah Jane (the granddaughter of Sir Charles).  While it initially gets off to a rocky start, with Tom getting into a lot of trouble with his friends for being rude to their English guests, it leads to a friendship through which Sir Charles is shown the error of his ways in trying to push through his plans.  Eventually, they come to nought as a volcano erupts on the land showing the danger of interfering with Maori land.

Doomey Dwyer had an illicit still, which he used to supply his 'grog'.

External links 

New Zealand children's television series
1970s New Zealand television series
1979 New Zealand television series debuts
1979 New Zealand television series endings
Television series set in the 1900s